Live at Woodstock is an album of American rapper DMX, consisting of recordings of his live performance at the infamous Woodstock '99 festival. It was released in 1999. It consists primarily of songs from It's Dark and Hell Is Hot, and Flesh of My Flesh, Blood of My Blood.

Track listing
 "Intro" – 1:13
 "I'm Gonna Start This" – 1:54
 "My Niggas" – 1:55
 "It's A War" – 2:03
 "Fuckin' With D" – 2:03
 "Stop Being Greedy" – 2:26
 "It's All Good" – 2:58
 "No Love For Me" – 1:23
 "Damien" – 2:34
 "Tell Me How U Feelin'" 1:35
 "Keep Your Shit The Hardest" – 2:58
 "How It's Goin' Down" – 3:22
 "Get At Me Dog" – 2:38
 "Ruff Ryders Anthem" – 3:50
 "Slippin'" – 4:14
 "Prayer" – 3:22
 "Ready To Meet Him" – 1:47

 "I'm Gonna Start This" is "Intro" to "It's Dark and Hell Is Hot".
 "It's A War" is the song "It's On" from the album DJ Clue Fri. "The Professional".
 "Tell Me How U Feelin '" to "Some X Shit" from the album Ruff Ryders Fri. "Ryde or Die Vol. 1".
 "Ruff Ryders Anthem" includes a chorus and a verse from the remix of the song included on the mixtape DJ Clue.

References

External links 
 Cover

DMX (rapper) albums
1999 live albums
Horrorcore albums
Ruff Ryders Entertainment albums
Woodstock Festival